"Love Makes No Sense" is a song written by Tony Tolbert and Lance Alexander and recorded by American recording artist Alexander O'Neal. It is the first single from the singer's fifth solo album, Love Makes No Sense (1993).

The single was recorded by Lance Alexander and prof. t at Flyte Tyme Studios, Edina, MN, with additional recording by Anthony "AJ" Jeffries, Steve Van Arden, and Jay Lean at Summa Music Group, Los Angeles, CA, and Westlake Audio, Hollywood, CA.

Release
Alexander O'Neal's 23rd hit single and it reached #26 in the UK Singles Chart. In the United States, the single reached #13 on Billboard's Hot R&B/Hip-Hop Singles & Tracks.

Track listing
 7" single (AM 7708, 587 708-7)
"Love Makes No Sense (7" Radio Mix)" - 4:00
"Love Makes No Sense (Brothers In Rhythm Remix Edit)" - 7:38

 12" single (31458 7707 1) 
"Love Makes No Sense (LP Version)" - 6:59
"Love Makes No Sense (Bonus Beat Mix)" - 6:57

 CD single (587 709-2) 
"Love Makes No Sense (7" Radio Mix)" - 4:03
"Love Makes No Sense (Album Version)" - 7:00
"Love Makes No Sense (Brothers In Rhythm Remix)" - 7:37
"Love Makes No Sense (Brothers In Rhythm Dub)" - 6:20
"Love Makes No Sense (Bonus Beat Mix)" - 6:58
"Love Makes No Sense (Instrumental)" - 6:57

 Cassette single (31458 7706 4)
"Love Makes No Sense (Radio Edit)" - 4:24
"Love Makes No Sense (LP Version)" - 6:59

Personnel
Credits are adapted from the album's liner notes.

 Alexander O'Neal - lead vocals 
 Lance Alexander - keyboards, piano, synthesizer, drum programming, percussion, rhythm arrangement
 Kevin Pierce - guitar
 Franklin Wharton - flute
 prof. t - vocal arrangement, additional vocals, backing vocals
 Joey Elias - backing vocals
 Carrie Harrington - backing vocals

Charts

Weekly charts

Year-end charts

References

External links
 

1993 singles
Alexander O'Neal songs
1993 songs
A&M Records singles
Tabu Records singles
New jack swing songs